The 2018 Southern Conference women's basketball tournament was held between March 1 and 4 in Asheville, North Carolina, at the U.S. Cellular Center. Mercer defeated ETSU to claim their first-ever SoCon tournament championship.

Seeds
Teams are seeded by record within the conference, with a tiebreaker system to seed teams with identical conference records.

Schedule
All tournament games are nationally televised on an ESPN network:

Bracket
 All times are Eastern.

See also
2018 Southern Conference men's basketball tournament

References

2017–18 Southern Conference women's basketball season
Southern Conference women's basketball tournament
Southern Conference women's basketball tournament
Southern Conference women's basketball tournament
SoCon women's
College basketball tournaments in North Carolina
SoCon women's